Tumtum Lake is a small lake located in the Upper Adams River valley in the Interior of British Columbia, Canada.  It is a popular fishing lake, containing rainbow trout, bull trout, and whitefish.  "Tumtum" is a Chinook Jargon word for "heart", or the "pulsing of the heart", and may refer to the sound of the waterfalls on the Upper Adams River downstream from the lake.

References

Lakes of British Columbia
Shuswap Country
Monashee Mountains
Kamloops Division Yale Land District